The 1935 season of the Paraguayan Primera División, the top category of Paraguayan football, was played by 10 teams. The national champions were Cerro Porteño.

Results

Standings

External links
Paraguay 1935 season at RSSSF

Para
Paraguayan Primera División seasons
Primera